Lyle G. Abeln (born March 9, 1945) was an American politician and educator.

Background 
Abeln was born in Richmond, Minnesota, and attended St. Boniface High School. Abeln received his Bachelor of Arts and Master of Arts degree from St. Cloud State University. He lived in Bloomington, Minnesota with his wife and family and taught mathematics. Abeln served in the Minnesota House of Representatives from 1975 to 1978 and was a Democrat.

References

1945 births
Living people
People from Stearns County, Minnesota
St. Cloud State University alumni
Schoolteachers from Minnesota
Democratic Party members of the Minnesota House of Representatives
People from Bloomington, Minnesota